Francis H. Becker (born October 15, 1915 – February 3, 2011) was a justice of the Iowa Supreme Court from September 20, 1965, to March 31, 1972, appointed from Dubuque County, Iowa.

Becker received an undergraduate degree from Saint Louis University in 1936 and a law degree from the Washington University School of Law in St. Louis, Missouri, in 1939. He entered the practice of law in Dubuque, Iowa, which was interrupted by service in the United States Army Air Corps in World War II.

Becker died in Bellingham, Washington, at the age of 95.

References

Justices of the Iowa Supreme Court
1915 births
2011 deaths